SWIR may refer to:
 Short-wavelength infrared, a region of the infrared light spectrum
 Sierra Wireless, a multinational communication company
 Southwest Indian Ridge, a mid-ocean ridge between Africa and Antarctica

See also 
 Svir (disambiguation)